Óscar Únzaga de la Vega (19 April 1916 – 19 April 1959) was a Bolivian political figure and rebel. Most significantly, he founded the Bolivian Socialist Falange (FSB) movement in 1937, and ran for President in the 1956 elections, when his party became the main opposition movement to the Movimiento Nacionalista Revolucionario (MNR). 
 
In 1959 Únzaga was one of fifty who died during an attempted coup by the FSB, with government forces reporting that he committed suicide. Supporters disputed the official version and stated that Únzaga had been assassinated. He is revered as a hero and martyr by some factions of well-to-do Bolivian political elites.

References

|-

|-

1916 births
1959 deaths
Bolivian Socialist Falange politicians
Candidates for President of Bolivia
People from Cochabamba
Politicians who committed suicide
Suicides by firearm in Bolivia
20th-century Bolivian politicians